Southern Highlands is a province in Papua New Guinea. Its provincial capital is the town of Mendi. According to Papua New Guinea's national 2011 census, the total population of Southern Highlands (after the separation of Hela Province) is 515,511 spread across .

Ethnic groups
Before the split there were two major ethnic groups, the Huli people and the Angal speakers. Today the majority of the population in Southern Highlands is made up of Angal or Angal Heneng speakers. They occupy the three provinces of Southern Highlands (Nipa, Mendi, Lai Valley, Imbongu (lower Mendi)), Hela (Magarima) and Enga (parts of Kandep).

Split to create Hela Province
In July 2009, Parliament passed legislation to create two new provinces by 2012.  One of these was to be created by removing the districts of Tari-Pori, Komo-Magarima, and Koroba-Kopiago from the Southern Highlands Province to form the new Hela Province. Hela Province officially came into being on 17 May 2012.

Regions
After the split of Hela, the province is divided into roughly three distinct geographic regions:

 The West: which includes the Southern Highlands districts of Nipa, Mendi, Lai Valley, Imbogu (lower Mendi), Hela District of Magarima, Kutubu and part of Kendep (Enga Province), and is the home of the speakers of dialects of the Anggal Heneng language.
 The East: which includes the districts of Kagua, Ialibu, Pangia and Erave, and is the home of the speakers of the Imbongu, Kewa, and Wiru languages, and home to the second highest mountain in Papua New Guinea, Mount Giluwe.
 The Lowlands: which stretch across the southern part of the Southern Highlands province from the volcanic peaks of Mount Bosavi to include the oilfields of Lake Kutubu, and includes the language groups of Biami (shared with Western Province) Foe, and Fasu.

Districts and LLGs
There are five districts in the province. Each district has one or more Local Level Government (LLG) areas. For census purposes, the LLG areas are subdivided into wards and those into census units.

Provincial leaders

The province was governed by a decentralised provincial administration, headed by a Premier, from 1978 to 1995. Following reforms taking effect that year, the national government reassumed some powers, and the role of Premier was replaced by a position of Governor, to be held by the winner of the province-wide seat in the National Parliament of Papua New Guinea.

Premiers (1978–1995)

Governors (1995–present)

Members of the National Parliament

The province and each district is represented by a Member of the National Parliament.  There is one provincial electorate and each district is an open electorate.

2006 state of emergency
On 1 August 2006, the government of Papua New Guinea declared a state of emergency in the country's Southern Highlands region. According to Prime Minister Sir Michael Somare, troops were deployed to restore 'law, order and good governance' in the region, following accusations of corruption, theft and misuse of government buildings at the hands of the regional government.

As a region rich in energy resources, the Southern Highlands was at the centre of plans to construct a gas pipeline to pump natural gas to Queensland in north Australia. The project would have resulted in much needed revenue for Papua New Guinea, and as it was believed that the instability in the region could jeopardise the project, the national government decided to intervene by declaring a state of emergency.  The move was supported by Parliament, although some criticism was leveled at the government for restricting press access to the region while the state of emergency was in force.  The companies involved  subsequently opted for the current PNG Gas project which has export facilities outside Port Moresby. This is operated by Esso Highlands, a subsidiary of Exxon Mobil Corporation, and is expected to begin production in 2014.

References

External Links 

 Andrew Strathern and Pamela J. Stewart Recordings From the Andrew Strathern and Pamela J. Stewart Photographs and Audiorecordings. MSS 477. Special Collections & Archives, UC San Diego.

 
Provinces of Papua New Guinea
Highlands Region